Roku, Inc. is an American publicly traded company based in San Jose, California, that manufactures a variety of digital media players for video streaming. Roku has an advertising business and also licenses its hardware and software to other companies.'History
Roku was founded in October 2002 as a limited liability company (LLC), by ReplayTV founder Anthony Wood. Roku (六) means "six" in the Japanese language, to represent the fact that Roku is the sixth company Wood started.

In April 2007 Wood was named a vice president of Netflix.
After Netflix decided to not build its own player, a new Roku company was incorporated in February 2008, based in Palo Alto, California, with Netflix as an investor of $6 million, to build a player.
Later in 2008 company headquarters moved to Saratoga, California, further south in Silicon Valley.
A round of venture capital funding from Menlo Ventures was announced in October 2008.
Another round of about $8.4 million was disclosed in 2009.
In 2015, the company announced it would be sub-leasing the buildings in Los Gatos, California from Netflix.

On September 28, 2017, the company held an initial public offering of stock and began trading on the Nasdaq exchange.

In 2017, Roku launched its self-serving advertising product to allow advertisers to serve ads to Roku's users. These include video ads, interactive video ads, audience development promotions and brand sponsorships. This was made possible through Roku allowing advertisers to transition from standard cable TV advertising to Roku's streaming platform. In 2016, Roku partnered with Magna, a media firm that specializes advertising, in order to incorporate targeted advertising on its streaming platform. In order to measure the success of its advertising efforts success, Roku partnered with Nielsen, a company that specializes in advertising effectiveness. In November 2019, Roku announced its acquisition of dataxu video advertising platform, for $150 million in cash and stocks. Roku shares rose more than two percent subsequent to the announcement.

In July 2019 Roku started moving to a new headquarters in San Jose, with plans to vacate offices subleased from Netflix.

On January 8, 2021, Roku announced it would acquire rights to Quibi's content, for an amount less than $100 million, and that all of Quibi's 75 programs would be available on their streaming platform, The Roku Channel.

On March 19, 2021, TZP Growth Partners completed the sale of This Old House Ventures to Roku. All 1,500 episodes of Ask This Old House and This Old House'' will be made available to owners of Roku streaming products free with ads and through their dedicated 24/7 Streaming TV channel. PBS will still have rights to air episodes on their platforms.

Legacy products
Roku's consumer products included:
 PhotoBridge HD1000, a system for displaying images on a high-definition television, as well as streaming MPEG video. The unit has four card readers on the front and can read from a CompactFlash Card type II, Memory Stick, MultiMediaCard, SD Memory Card, or SmartMedia Card
 Roku SoundBridge, a network music player
 SoundBridge Radio, a network music player with built-in speakers and subwoofer, AM‑FM receiver, volume-ramping alarm clock, preset buttons, SD slot, and headphone jack

For retailers, Roku also produced:
 BrightSign solid-state media player, designed to drive HD displays in a retail environment.

Roku's audio products did not use internal storage but relied on Wi-Fi or Ethernet to stream digital audio over a network, either from Internet radio or a computer attached to the same network. Roku introduced the Radio Roku Internet radio directory in August 2007; Radio Roku provides a directory of Internet stations, accessible from a web browser or from SoundBridge players.

Roku Streaming Player

Roku Streaming Players are set-top boxes for the delivery of over-the-top content. Content is provided by Roku partners, identified using the "channel" vernacular. Each separate channel supports content from one partner, although some content partners have more than one channel. In May 2011, Roku stated the Streaming Players had over one million viewers and had delivered 15 million channel downloads.

Roku devices support both on-demand content and live streaming. For live TV streams, Roku supports Apple HLS (HTTP Live Streaming) adaptive streaming technology. Both free and paid "channels" are available, as are some games. 
Roku Streaming Players are open-platform devices with a freely available SDK that enables anyone to create new channels. The channels are written in a Roku-specific language called BrightScript, a scripting language the company calls "similar to Visual Basic".

The Roku Channel

Roku launched its own free, ad-supported streaming channel on its devices in October 2017. At launch it included licensed content from studios such as Lionsgate, Metro-Goldwyn-Mayer, Paramount Pictures, Sony Pictures Entertainment, Warner Bros., Disney, and Universal Pictures, as well as from The Roku Channel content publishers American Classics, FilmRise, Nosey, OVGuide, Popcornflix, Vidmark, and YuYu. It implemented an ad revenue sharing model with content providers. On August 8, 2018, The Roku Channel became available on web as well. Roku also added the "Featured Free" section as the top section of its main menu from where users can get access to direct streaming of shows and movies from its partners. On April 7, 2020, The Roku Channel launched in the UK, with a different selection of movies and TV shows.

Roku TV
Roku licenses its technology and proprietary operating system (Roku OS) to service operators including Sky and Telstra, and television manufacturers and distributors such as TCL and Philips. Roku announced its first branded smart TV in early 2014 and it was released in late 2014. These TVs are manufactured by companies like TCL and Hisense, and use the Roku user interface as the "brain" of the TV. Roku TVs are updated in the same way as Roku's streaming devices, though on a slightly modified schedule due to the extra features and picture/audio adjustment options the Roku TV menu interface must support.

Several manufacturers offer added features for over-the-air reception for added cord-cutter value, including extended electronic program guides which provide more information than regularly sent by the PSIP protocol, and over-the-air program search integrated into the Roku search system. Also offered are program buffers and pausing with the use of a 16GB+ USB flash drive.

References

External links
 Roku Website
 

Electronics companies of the United States
Companies based in San Jose, California
2002 establishments in California
Electronics companies established in 2002
Companies listed on the Nasdaq
2017 initial public offerings